Pipiza fenestrata is a species of hoverfly, from the family Syrphidae, in the order Diptera. They are found in Central Europe and live in deciduous forests. This species of Pipiza tends to live deeper in the forest than others in this genus. Males of this species possess holoptic vision, while females have dichoptic vision.

References

Diptera of Europe
Pipizinae
Insects described in 1822
Taxa named by Johann Wilhelm Meigen